Delirium is the third album by Wrathchild, released in 1989. It marks the final appearances of Rocky Shades and Lance Rocket.

Track listing
 "Delirium"
 "Watch Me Shake Me"
 "That's What U Get (When U Fall in Love)"
 "My Girlz"
 "Long Way 2 Go"
 "Good Girlz"
 "Do What U Wanna"
 "Kid Pusher"
 "She's High on Luv"
 "Rokk Me Over"
 "Only 4 the Fun"
 "Drive Me Krazy"

Band members
 Rocky Shades - vocals
 Lance Rocket - guitar
 Marc Angel - bass
 Eddie Starr - drums

1989 albums
Wrathchild albums